Robert J. Riley (born July 6, 1948) is an American former professional basketball player. He was selected in the 1970 NBA draft by the Atlanta Hawks with the 82nd overall pick, the same draft the Hawks selected future Hall of Fame player Pete Maravich with the third overall pick. Riley's NBA career lasted just seven games.

References

1948 births
Living people
American expatriate basketball people in France
American men's basketball players
Atlanta Hawks draft picks
Atlanta Hawks players
Basketball players from Columbus, Ohio
Forwards (basketball)
Mount St. Mary's Mountaineers men's basketball players
Sunbury Mercuries players
Wilkes-Barre Barons players